Unione Sportiva Dilettantistica Real Forte dei Marmi-Querceta, normally referred to as Real Forte Querceta, is an Italian association football club located in Forte dei Marmi, Tuscany. It currently plays in the Serie D. Its colors are black and blue.

The club was born in 2012 as the merger of U.S.D. Forte dei Marmi and Querceta Calcio from Querceta, a frazione of the neighbouring town of Seravezza.

Notable former managers
 Silvio Baldini (1990–1991)

References

External links
 Official Facebook page

Association football clubs established in 1908
Football clubs in Tuscany
1908 establishments in Italy